William Henry Rinehart (September 13, 1825 – October 28, 1874) was a noted American sculptor. He is considered "the last important American sculptor to work in the classical style."

Biography
The son of Israel Rinehart (1792–1871) and Mary (Snader) Rinehart (1797–1865), William Henry Rinehart was born near Union Bridge, Maryland, where he attended school until he was nearly eighteen. He then began to work on his father's farm, but also became the assistant of a stone-cutter in the neighborhood. In 1844 he began an apprenticeship in the stone-yard of Baughman and Bevan on the site of what is now the Peabody Institute in Baltimore, and studied sculpture at what is now called the Maryland Institute College of Art.

In 1855 Rinehart went to Italy to continue his studies. While there he executed two bas-reliefs in marble, Morning and Evening. On his return, two years later, he opened a studio in Baltimore, where he executed numerous busts, a fountain-figure for the main U.S. Post Office in Washington, DC; and two bronze figures, Backwoodsman and Indian, flanking the clock in the House of Representatives Chamber of the U.S. Capitol. In 1858 he settled in Rome where he would live the rest of his life, except for trips back to the United States in 1866 and 1872. Rinehart's burial was funded by his friends William Thompson Walters and Benjamin Franklin Newcomer and he was buried at Green Mount Cemetery in Baltimore.

Legacy
Rinehart was financially successful in his lifetime, executing many commissions for wealthy and cultured clients. American patrons often traveled to Italy to meet Rinehart and plan projects for their estates back in America. Rinehart's most important patron and sponsor was William T. Walters, founder of Baltimore's Walters Art Gallery (now the Walters Art Museum).

William Henry Rinehart left his estate in trust for the teaching of sculpture at the Maryland Institute College of Art. In his name, MICA established the Rinehart School of Sculpture and a Rinehart fellowship. The Rinehart School's alumni would include the estimable Hans Schuler, born the year Rinehart died.

According to artcyclopedia.com and askart.com, Rinehart's sculptures, neoclassical in style and mostly of human figures, are in public collections such as those of the Metropolitan Museum of Art (New York City), the National Gallery of Art, (Washington, DC), the Walters Art Museum (Baltimore), the Museum of Fine Arts, Boston, the Brooklyn Museum of Art (New York City), the Carnegie Museum (Pittsburgh), and Ohio's Columbus Museum of Art, among others.

Selected works
Bas-reliefs of Morning and Evening (c. 1856), plaster, Smithsonian American Art Museum, Washington, D.C.
Backwoodsman and Indian (1858), bronze, Monumental Clock, House of Representatives Chamber, U.S. Capitol. Now exhibited in the Capitol crypt.
Sleeping Children (1859), marble, Sisson tomb, Greenmount Cemetery, Baltimore, Maryland. At least 25 replicas in plaster and marble.
Woman of Samaria (Rebecca at the Well) (1859–61), marble, Corcoran Gallery of Art, Washington, D.C. Marble replica (1872) at Metropolitan Museum of Art.
Leander (1859–60), marble, Newark Museum, Newark, New Jersey. Marble replica (1870) at Chrysler Museum of Art.
Bust of Mrs. William T. Walters (1862), marble, Walters Art Museum, Baltimore, Maryland.
Hero (1866), plaster, Smithsonian American Art Museum, Washington, D.C. At least 9 marble replicas.
Antigone Pouring a Libation over the Corpse of Her Brother Polynices (1867–70), plaster, Smithsonian American Art Museum, Washington, D.C. Marble replica (1870) at Metropolitan Museum of Art.
Chief Justice Roger B. Taney (1867–72), bronze, Maryland State House, Annapolis, Maryland. Bronze replica (1872) at Mount Vernon Place, Baltimore, Maryland.
Endymion (1868–74), plaster, Smithsonian American Art Museum, Washington, D.C. Marble replica (1874) at Corcoran Gallery of Art. Bronze replica at Rinehart's grave in Greenmount Cemetery, Baltimore, Maryland.
Clytie (1869–70), marble, Peabody Institute, Baltimore, Maryland. Marble replica (1872) at Metropolitan Museum of Art.
Latona and Her Children – Apollo and Diana (1871–72), plaster, Smithsonian American Art Museum, Washington, D.C. Marble replica (1874) at Metropolitan Museum of Art.
Atalanta (1874), marble, Baltimore Museum of Art.

See also

Maryland Institute College of Art
Walters Art Museum
Neoclassicism
Arthur Quartley (American painter; friend of William Henry Rinehart)  
Roger B. Taney (sculpture)  
Revolutionary War Door, which was completed by Reinhart and hangs in the U.S. Capitol

References

Articles
Metropolitan Museum of Art (New York, N.Y.) William Henry Rinehart (1825–1874) (New York : The Museum, ©1999–©2001) 
Stebbins, Theodore E. William Henry Rinehart (Boston, MA : Museum of Fine Arts, Boston, 1992)

Books
Davenport, Ray, Davenport's Art Reference and Price Guide, Gold Edition (Ventura, California, 2005) ; 
Ross, Marvin C.  Walters Art Gallery;  Johns Hopkins University; Peabody Institute. A catalogue of the work of William Henry Rinehart, Maryland sculptor, 1825–1874 (Baltimore: Trustees of the Peabody Institute and the Walters Art Gallery, 1948)  
Rusk, William Sener. William Henry Rinehart, sculptor (Baltimore, Md., N.T.A. Munder, 1939) 
 Appleton's Cyclopedia of American Biography, edited by James Grant Wilson and John Fiske, New York: D. Appleton and Company, 1887–1889

External links
Page on William Henry Rinehart at the Metropolitan Museum of Art [includes IMAGES of some of Rinehart's works in the museum's collection]
Artcyclopedia page on William Henry Rinehart [features links to many IMAGES of the sculptures at museums and public collections]
Askart.com page on William Henry Rinehart [includes an IMAGE]
Marylandartsource.com page on William Henry Rinehart
Auction result, Sotheby's, New York, 24 May 2006, with COLOR IMAGE
 

1825 births
1874 deaths
19th-century American sculptors
19th-century American male artists
American male sculptors
Sculptors from Maryland
Burials at Green Mount Cemetery
People from Union Bridge, Maryland
Maryland Institute College of Art alumni